

Headda or Ceadda (died c. 774) was a medieval Bishop of Hereford.

Headda was consecrated between 758 and 770 and died between 770 and 777.

Citations

References

External links
  (listing shared with Ceatta of Lichfield)

Bishops of Hereford
8th-century English bishops
770s deaths
Year of birth unknown